Toni Pearce (born 13 April 1990) is a former President of the National Union of Students in the United Kingdom. Pearce was elected at the 2013 NUS National Conference in April 2013 and re-elected April 2014.

From 2011 to 2013, Pearce held the position of NUS Vice President (Further Education). Before that, she was President at the Students' Union of Cornwall College, an institution of Further Education. Pearce was the first ever NUS President not to have attended  university.

Early life
Pearce attended Cornwall College from the age of 16, however she was diagnosed with Ehlers-Danlos Syndrome Type III, which meant that she missed a large number of lessons whilst in hospital recovering from operations. As such, Pearce failed two of her AS levels at the first attempt.

Political affiliation
During the elections for NUS President (2013, 2014) Pearce stood as a candidate with no official affiliation to a political party. However, Pearce announced in 2013 that she joined the Labour Party.

References

 

Presidents of the National Union of Students (United Kingdom)
Living people
People with Ehlers–Danlos syndrome
National Union of Students (United Kingdom)
1990 births
Labour Party (UK) people
People educated at Cornwall College